Grand Trunk railway stations or Grand Trunk railroad stations may refer to former and active passenger rail stations built for the Grand Trunk Railway or its subsidiaries the Grand Trunk Western Railroad and the Grand Trunk Pacific Railway.

In the United States, some of these stations are listed on the National Register of Historic Places (NRHP).

In Canada
(by province)

 Grand Trunk Pacific station (Dunster), Dunster, British Columbia
 Grand Trunk station (Caledonia), Caledonia, Ontario
 Grand Trunk station (Hamilton), Hamilton, Ontario
 Grand Trunk station (Berlin, ON), Kitchener, Ontario
 Grand Trunk station (Napanee), Napanee, Ontario
 Grand Trunk station, (Niagara Falls), Niagara Falls, Ontario
 Grand Trunk station, (Parkdale), Parkdale, Toronto, Ontario
 Grand Trunk station, (Riverdale), Toronto, Ontario
 Grand Trunk station, (Uxbridge), Uxbridge, Ontario
 Grand Trunk station (Weston), Weston, Ontario
 Grand Trunk station (Coaticook), Coaticook, Quebec
 Grand Trunk station (Richmond), Richmond, Quebec
 Grand Trunk Pacific station (Biggar), Biggar, Saskatchewan

In the United States
(by state)

 Grand Trunk station (Bethel), Bethel, Maine
 Grand Trunk station (Lewiston), listed on the NRHP in Maine
 Grand Trunk station (Mechanic Falls), Mechanic Falls, Maine
 Grand Trunk station (Oxford, Maine), Oxford, Maine
 Grand Trunk station (Portland), Portland, Maine
 Grand Trunk station (South Paris), South Paris, Maine
 Grand Trunk station (Yarmouth), Yarmouth, Maine, listed on the NRHP
 Grand Trunk station (Battle Creek), Battle Creek, Michigan
 Grand Trunk station (Detroit), Detroit, Michigan
 Grand Trunk station (Durand), Durand, Michigan, listed on the NRHP
 Grand Trunk Western station (Lansing), Lansing, Michigan, listed on the NRHP
 Grand Trunk station (Port Huron), Port Huron, Michigan
 Grand Trunk station (Berlin, New Hampshire), Berlin, New Hampshire
 Grand Trunk station (Gorham), Gorham, New Hampshire
 Grand Trunk station (Island Pond), Island Pond, Vermont

Grand Trunk Railway
Railway lines
Railway stations